Labeobarbus gruveli is a species of ray-finned fish in the genus Labeobarbus which is known only from the Dubreka River in Guinea.

References 

 

gruveli
Taxa named by Jacques Pellegrin
Fish described in 1911